Ginestar is a municipality in the comarca of Ribera d'Ebre in the province of Tarragona, Catalonia, Spain.

This traditional Catalan village with a  population of around 800 people still retains many of its traditions and farming methods, and its broad and narrow streets are lined with traditional Catalan houses.

Located only a short distance from the river Ebro, this is also becoming a popular destination for anglers from all over Europe. It is as well situated in a rich archaeological zone, including the site of the Barranc de Gàfols.

Crops grown in this area are mostly vines, olives and almonds; soft fruits are also grown and the village is alive in the summer months with farmers gathering their crops and preparing them for transport to the wholesalers.

There are several fiestas in Ginestar, which usually commence in April and continue through till November, when the village celebrates its patron saint's day, Sant Martí.

References

External links
 Government data pages 

Municipalities in Ribera d'Ebre